Jean Marie Behra (16 February 1921 – 1 August 1959) was a Formula One driver who raced for the Gordini, Maserati, BRM, Ferrari and Porsche teams.

Appearance and personality
Behra was small in stature, stocky, and weighed 178 pounds. Behra had big shoulders and was scarred from 12 crashes. In 1955 he had an ear torn off from a collision. He sometimes drove magnificently, while at other times he drove with a lack of enthusiasm.  Behra was known for being hard-charging and temperamental, which led to confrontations with Ferrari team managers after being accused of overstressing engines at the 24 Hours of Le Mans and the Reims Grand Prix race in 1959.  He was dismissed from the Ferrari team after assaulting a team manager, shortly before his death.

Career synopsis

He raced motorcycles for Moto Guzzi prior to changing to sports cars and Grand Prix racing. In January 1950 he drove (with Julio Quinlin) a Simca 8 coupé to third place in the Monte Carlo Rally. Behra began driving cars competitively in 1952. Joakim Bonnier claimed that he learned the majority of his racing skill from Behra. Although he never achieved victory in a World Championship Formula One race, he managed an unquenchable thirst for motorsport, being considered a formidable competitor to the day he died. He hit the headlines when he won the non-title 1952 Reims Grand Prix. Between then and 1959 he scored many victories, but none in Formula One championship races.

Gordini

Behra was in a Gordini in the Panamericana road race in the Mexican state of Oaxaca in November 1952. He won the first stage of the five-day race from Mexico's southern border to the United States border at Ciudad Juárez near El Paso. He started 19th and finished with a time of 3 hours, 41 minutes, and 44 seconds. On the second day of competition Behra crashed his car on a curve approximately fifty miles from Puebla. In April 1954 Behra passed the leader in the last ten minutes on his way to victory in the Grand Prix of Pau, France. He finished  ahead of Maurice Trintignant after having to make many pit stops due to mechanical trouble. Behra drove a six-cylinder Gordini.

Maserati

Behra finished first at the Grand Prix de Pau for a second consecutive year, this time at the wheel of a Maserati. Alberto Ascari led until the 19th lap but dropped back after brake failure. A crowd of 50,000 watched as only eleven of sixteen starters finished the race. Behra and Luigi Musso were teammates in the 1,008 kilometer Supercortemaggiore Grand Prix at Monza, Italy. The two Italians shared a 3,000 cubic centimeter Maserati that won and established course and lap records for 6.3 kilometer track.

Behra had surgery on his leg in June 1956,
forcing him to miss a 1,000 kilometer Monza Grand Prix. He earned the pole position for a Grand Prix at Rouen, France in July 1956. His Maserati was clocked at an average speed of nearly 155.46 kilometers per hour. Behra drove a Maserati to capture the Grand Prix of Rome, a 2,000 cubic centimeters sports car event, in October 1956. His winning distance was 166.030 kilometers. He covered one lap in 2 minutes, 16.9 seconds, to average 174.003 kilometers an hour. This established a record for the Castelfusano track.

In April 1957 Behra turned in the quickest time for the Pau Grand Prix. He circuited the 2.77 meter course in
1 minute 35.7 seconds, which was a half second slower than his lap record time.
Behra was injured while testing a car for the Mille Miglia in May 1957. He recovered and entered a Maserati in the 24 hours of Le Mans on 22 June. Behra was triumphant in a Maserati at Kristianstad, Sweden in August 1957. He drove in a Swedish 6-hour Grand Prix at the Rabelov, 6,537 meter,
asphalt track. He followed this with a win in the Grand Prix of Modena, Italy in September.

Porsche

Behra drove a Porsche to victory in the 6th Rouen Grand Prix. He bested the British drivers, Graham Hill and Alan Stacey. Behra took 4th place at Oporto in the 1958 Portuguese Grand Prix, driving for BRM. He drove a Porsche to achieve first place in the Grand Prix of Berlin, Germany held in September. He
Altogether he scored wins in 8 straight European races in 1958. In each sports car event he piloted a Porsche Spyder. In Formula One he drove exclusively for BRM that year. Behra
finished 4th at Riverside International Raceway in a small Porsche RSK, in October 1958. He made a quick exit and took an airplane to Europe,
where he left for the Grand Prix of Morocco at Casablanca. He
was in such a hurry that he left Riverside, California in an ambulance to make his flight.

Final season and death

In 1959 he moved to Ferrari where he partnered with Tony Brooks. Behra won a  international race of Formula One cars at Aintree, in April 1959. He averaged 88.7 miles per hour in an event in which Brooks took second place, 10 seconds behind.

While still contracted to the team, he began development of a Formula Two car based on a Porsche 718 RSK. The team, known as Behra-Porsche, entered the 1959 Monaco Grand Prix with Maria Teresa de Filippis at the wheel but did not qualify. Despite the lack of initial success, Behra regarded the project as "tremendous fun" and was rewarded when Hans Herrmann drove the car to second in the prestigious Reims F2 race supporting that year's French Grand Prix. In so doing, Behra had beaten Scuderia Ferrari's own F2 entries, enraging Enzo Ferrari and doing little to ease tensions in an already strained relationship with the team. Things came to a head later that weekend, after he retired from the Grand Prix with a piston failure. Behra was involved in a strong discussion in a restaurant in which he punched team manager Romolo Tavoni and another patron, and was instantly dismissed from the team.

Less than a month later he crashed his Porsche RSK in rainy weather in the sports car race that preceded the German Grand Prix at AVUS, in Berlin, Germany. He was thrown from his car and fatally injured when he hit a flagpole, causing a skull fracture.

The sports car race featured entries of small, under 1,500 c.c. engine capacity. After three laps Behra
was third behind Wolfgang von Trips and Bonnier, who eventually finished one and two.
The AVUS was unique among race tracks. It used a strip of the Autobahn  in length. The north and south bound lanes were fifty feet apart. Behra lost control in the pouring rain, while going . The Porsche began to fishtail with the tail of the car going higher and higher up the slick, steep bank. Then the Porsche spun and went over the top of the banking, with its nose pointing toward the sky. It landed heavily on its side on top of the banking. It remained there wrecked, while the race continued on underneath. Behra was thrown out and for a fleeting moment he could be seen against the background of the sky, with his arms outstretched as though attempting to fly. He impacted one of eight flagpoles arranged at the summit of the embankment
which bore the flags of the competing nations. The flagpole toppled over when Behra collided with it,
about halfway to its top.

Behra came down into trees and rolled almost into a street where drivers and cars often waited in a paddock to practice. A doctor arrived from a Red Cross ambulance close by. He examined Behra briefly and shook his head. A hospital bulletin stated that Behra broke most of his ribs in addition to the skull fracture which killed him. Currently AVUS is a vital part of the German public highway system as Autobahn A 115.

Mourning

Behra was buried in Nice, France on 7 August, six days after his fatal crash. He had three funeral services: one in Berlin, another in Paris, and a final one in Nice. At the Nice service, 3,000 mourners lined the streets from
wall to wall.

Behra left a nineteen-year-old son, Jean Paul. Behra's demise left only Maurice Trintignant among living French drivers of fame. Trintignant comforted Behra's family and called on the young men of France to defend the colours of their country in international motor racing. Conspicuously absent among those present in the racing community was Enzo Ferrari. He dropped Behra as a factory driver ten days before his death when he learned that Behra was going to race a Porsche at Avus in breach of their agreement and sent no remembrance to the funeral masses.

Racing record

Complete Formula One World Championship results
(key) (Race in italics indicates fastest lap (shared))

* Indicates shared drive with Harry Schell
† Indicates shared drive with Cesare Perdisa
‡ Indicates shared drive with Roberto Mieres

Non-Championship Formula One results
(key)

* Indicates shared drive with André Simon
† Indicates shared drive with Jacques Pollet

Notes

References

1921 births
1959 deaths
French racing drivers
French Formula One drivers
Gordini Formula One drivers
Maserati Formula One drivers
BRM Formula One drivers
Ferrari Formula One drivers
French motorcycle racers
500cc World Championship riders
Racing drivers who died while racing
Sport deaths in Germany
24 Hours of Le Mans drivers
World Sportscar Championship drivers
Sportspeople from Nice
12 Hours of Sebring drivers
Carrera Panamericana drivers
Porsche Motorsports drivers